Opuntia galapageia is a species of cactus. It is endemic to the Galápagos Islands, part of Ecuador. Forms occurring on different islands have been treated as separate species and subtaxa of these species. Opuntia echios, Opuntia helleri, Opuntia insularis, Opuntia megasperma, Opuntia myriacantha and Opuntia saxicola are now sunk within O. galapageia.

Description
 The subspecies, variety or forma "Opuntia g. echios" has the most formidable spines; up to ten inches (25 centimeters) in length.

Taxonomy

Opuntia galapageia was first described by John Stevens Henslow in 1837. It was first recorded by Charles Darwin on Santiago (James) Island. Darwin was ashore there for nine days in 1835.  Subsequently, at least five other species of Opuntia were described from the Galápagos: Opuntia helleri, Opuntia insularis, Opuntia megasperma, Opuntia myriacantha and Opuntia saxicola. All were treated by David Hunt in 2006 as included within O. galapageia, a placement accepted by the IUCN Red List as of 2017, although they had been assessed as separate species in 2000. Plants of the World Online also accepts the placement within O. galapageia, and includes Opuntia echios, in most cases placing the species in an infraspecific taxon (see the list below).

Infraspecific taxa
A large number of varieties and other infraspecific taxa have been named. , Plants of the World Online accepts the following:

Two other infraspecific taxa that have been named are not recognized by Plants of the World Online as distinct from the species:
Opuntia galapageia var. brossettii Backeb.
Opuntia galapageia subvar. orientalis (J.T.Howell) Backeb.

Distribution
Opuntia galapageia is endemic to the Galápagos Islands. Forms occurring on different islands have been described as subtaxa of the species (see the list above). Island distributions given by Plants of the World Online include: 

Fernandina
O. galapageia var. insularis
Isabela
O. galapageia subvar. inermis
O. galapageia var. insularis
O. galapageia var. profusa
O. galapageia var. saxicola
Seymour
O. galapageia var. zacana
Pinzon
O. galapageia var. macrocarpa
Santa Cruz
O. galapageia var. gigantea
Santa Fe
O. galapageia subvar. barringtonensis
Santiago
O. galapageia var. profusa

References

galapageia
Flora of the Galápagos Islands
Cacti of South America
Taxonomy articles created by Polbot